Counter-Espionage is a 1942 American comedy film directed by Edward Dmytryk. Counter-Espionage was the ninth film in Columbia's Lone Wolf series, based on characters created by Louis Joseph Vance. It is also known as The Lone Wolf in Scotland Yard.

Plot

In the midst of World War II, Harvey Leeds, working as secretary for the highly reputed British criminologist Sir Stafford Hart in London, is lobbying for legislation ordering the immediate arrest of all foreign agents stationed in Britain. Harvey is engaged to Sir Stafford's daughter, Pamela, and is visiting the Hart mansion. He is about to leave the mansion to be with Pamela, who works at an air raid shelter, when he happens upon a briefcase in the foyer. He looks through the briefcase that belongs to Sir Stafford's assistant, Kent Wells, before heading out in the night. He does not get far though, and is knocked out by air raid warden Anton Schugg and thrown into the back of the warden's ambulance.

Kent Wells happened to see Harvey go through his briefcase, and when he goes upstairs to the mansion's top floor, he sees someone opening Sir Stafford's safe in the library. Before Wells has any chance of stopping him, the man is off with the plan for the government's new secret weapon - the beam detector. The man drops a cufflink with the letter ”L” on it.

Sir Stafford involves Scotland Yard in the investigation of the stolen plans. Two American Inspectors, Crane and Dickens, are visiting the Yard and are invited by the chief investigator on the case, Inspector J. Stephens of Scotland Yard. The three men go to the Hart mansion and conclude that the ”L” must mean that notorious jewel thief Michael Lanyard is responsible for the theft. He is also known as the ”Lone Wolf”.

An air raid hits London, and during the commotion that ensues, the Lone Wolf meets with his valet Jamison. The building closest to them begins to topple, and the Lone Wolf saves a man from being crushed by it. The man, air raid warden George Barrow, expresses his gratitude and grants Lone Wolf a favor.

During the rest of the raid, the Lone Wolf and his valet hide out in the same air raid shelter as Pamela works in. The Lone Wolf tries to hide the plans he has stolen, but Inspector Stephens soon arrives and arrests him for espionage. Stephens doesn't find the plans though, and Jamison  manages to get them back after the Lone Wolf is taken away.

During interrogation of the Lone Wolf, he manages to grab a gun and take Sir Stafford hostage. He escapes from custody, and happens to meets air raid warden Schugg outside, who gives him a ride, although not oblivious of his crime. Schugg then stops the car and offers the Lone Wolf a deal. He wants to buy the plans on behalf of the German agents in London. In charge of the Germans is the undercover agent Gustave Sossel. When the Lone Wolf is taken to the German agents’ hideout, he also discovers that the Germans hold Harvey prisoner. The Lone Wolf explains that he doesn't have the plans, but he can retrieve them in a few days. Kent appears at the hideout and explains that he captured Harvey because he was too nosy. He also explains that the Germans intend to reveal the plans to Berlin through a radio broadcast from a radio transmitter at the hideout. The Lone Wolf is then let out in the street with instructions to inform Schugg when he has the plans.

The newspapers report that Sir Stafford has died in the air raid. When Inspector Stephens visits the Hart mansion, he discovers a secret document sanctioning the Lone Wolf to work undercover for British Intelligence to disclose and catch a ring of spies in the country. Later, the Lone Wolf also makes contact with the Hart mansion, thus leading the police away from the mansion and to his own apartment. The Lone Wolf then go off in search for the German hideout, but discovers that Pamela is following them.

Lanyard tricks her into phoning Stephens so that there will be police reinforcements in the district surrounding the spies's headquarters. Pamela alerts the police of their whereabouts, and they come to surround the German hideout, believing they are close to catching the thief. The Lone Wolf escapes the ring of police by riding in Barrow's ambulance. The Lone Wolf then returns to where he believes the hideout is, under the Blue Parrot Café, and finds Pamela there. They are both apprehended by the German agents and taken to Sossel. It turns out Kent's real name is Kurt Weil, and that he's an agent for the Germans. The three police inspectors, who have tracked the Lone Wolf, are also apprehended by the Germans. When the Germans start broadcasting the plans, Barrow arrives and pretends to hold a stick of dynamite in his hand. The German agents throw down their guns, and the Lone Wolf explains to the Germans that the plans were fake, in order to find the ring of German spies. The Lone Wolf then produces the real plans to the police and is freed of all suspicion.

Cast

References

External links
 
 
 

1942 films
1942 comedy films
American comedy films
American black-and-white films
1940s English-language films
Films directed by Edward Dmytryk
Columbia Pictures films
Films set in London
Films with screenplays by Aubrey Wisberg
The Lone Wolf films
World War II films made in wartime